Henri Martin is a Republican member of the Connecticut State Senate, representing the 31st District since 2015.

Career 
Martin is the State Senator for the 31st Senate District since 2015, representing several towns of Central Connecticut in the Connecticut Senate, including the towns of Bristol, Harwinton (part), Plainville (part), Plymouth, and Thomaston.

He has worked heavily against implementing tolls in his home state, and he was instrumental in the design of an alternative called Prioritize Progress. Prioritize Progress dictates that bonds be used directly for transportation improvement, rather than for pork barrel legislation. This alternative is said to provide stable, steady funding for the Connecticut Department of Transportation, with minimal cost or debt to its citizens.

He also stands strongly against the legalization of Marijuana.

Martin attended St. Anselm College and the University of Hartford.

See also
Connecticut Senate

References

External links 
 Henri Martin at Votesmart.org

Republican Party Connecticut state senators
Living people
Year of birth missing (living people)
Saint Anselm College alumni
21st-century American politicians
People from Bristol, Connecticut